This is a list of Greenland national football team results (unofficial matches) from 1977 to present.

Results

1970s

1980s

1990s

2000s

2010s

2020s

References

External links
 
Greenland at RSSSF

Results (unofficial matches)
Lists of national association football team unofficial results